Demetrio González (7 October 1927 – 25 January 2015) was a Spanish-born Mexican film actor and singer of ranchera music. Born in Asturias, Spain, he is sometimes called El Charro Español. He has starred in ranchera-music films from 1955 to 1968. Dos Corazones y un Cielo (1959), in which he co-starred with Rosa de Castilla and Eulalio González, is one of his most notable films. He died after a stroke in Tepoztlán, Morelos, Mexico in 2015. aged 87.

Selected filmography
Cada hijo una cruz (1957) ... Raymundo
Guitarras de Medianoche (1958)
Dos Corazones y un Cielo (1959) ... Antonio Castillo
 Two Cheap Husbands (1960)
Cada Oveja Con Su Pareja (1965) ... Ángel

References

External links

Mexican male film actors
Mexican people of Asturian descent
Mexican male singers
Golden Age of Mexican cinema
1927 births
2015 deaths
Spanish emigrants to Mexico